A worker bee is any female (eusocial) bee that lacks the full reproductive capacity of the colony's queen bee; under most circumstances, this is correlated to an increase in certain non-reproductive activities relative to a queen. While worker bees occur in all eusocial bee species, the term is rarely used (outside of scientific literature) for any bees other than honey bees.

Honey bee workers gather pollen into the pollen baskets on their back legs and carry it back to the hive where it is used as food for the developing brood. Pollen carried on their bodies may be carried to another flower where a small portion can rub off onto the pistil, resulting in cross pollination. A significant amount of the world's food supply, particularly fruit, depends greatly on crop pollination by honey bees. Nectar is sucked up through the proboscis, mixed with enzymes in the stomach, and carried back to the hive, where it is stored in wax cells and evaporated into honey.

Life cycle 
Although the life span of a worker bee is longer than that of a drone, it is generally only a few months, and rarely can survive a year. The life span is 1-2 months in summer and can be up to 6-8 months over autumn and winter. The lifespan of summer worker bees can increase to 6 months if placed in a colony that doesn't have a queen.

Honey bee workers keep the hive temperature uniform in the critical brood area (where new bees are raised). This is in the centre frames of the brood box. Workers must maintain the hive's brood chamber at 34.4 °C to incubate the eggs. If it is too hot, they collect water and deposit it around the hive, then fan air through with their wings causing cooling by evaporation. If it is too cold, they cluster together to generate body heat. This is an example of homeostasis.

The life of all honey bees starts as an egg, which is laid by the queen in the bottom of a wax cell in the brood area of a hive. A worker egg hatches after three days into a larva. Nurse bees feed it royal jelly at first, then pollen and honey for six days. It then becomes an inactive pupa.

During its 14 days as a pupa, sealed in a capped cell, it grows into a worker (female) bee, emerging on the 21st day. In most species of honey bees, workers do everything but lay eggs and mate, though Cape honey bee workers can lay eggs. They build the comb from wax extruded from glands under their abdomen. When fully developed, they perform a number of tasks (see below).

Swarming behavior 

When a colony absconds (all bees leave the colony) or divides and so creates a swarm and then establishes a new colony, the bees must regress in their behaviour in order to establish the first generation in the new home. The most urgent task will be the creation of new beeswax for comb. Comb is much more difficult to come by than honey and requires about six times the energy to create. A newly hived swarm on bars (top bar hive) or empty foundation (Langstroth box hive) will often be fed sugar water, which they can then rapidly consume to create wax for new comb. (Mature hives cannot be so fed as they will store it in place of nectar, although a wintering hive may have to be fed if insufficient honey was left by the beekeeper.)

Progression of tasks

Cell cleaning (days 1–2) 
Brood cells must be cleaned before the next use. Cells will be inspected by the queen and if unsatisfactory they will not be used. Worker bees in the cleaning phase will perform this cleaning. If the cells are not clean, the worker bee must do it again and again.

Nurse bee (days 3–12) 
Nurse bees feed the worker larvae worker jelly which is secreted from glands that produce royal jelly. They will also go into the special cells to create a semi-royal jelly that is similar to the royal but it tastes more like honey.

Advanced Nurse Bees (days 6–12)
 Nurse Bees will then feed royal jelly to the queen larva and drones receive worker jelly for 1 to 3 days at which time they are started on a diet of honey.

Wax production (days 13–18) 
Wax bees build cells from wax, repair old cells, and store nectar and pollen
brought in by other workers.  Early in the worker's career she will exude wax from the space between several of her abdominal segments. Four sets of wax glands, situated inside the last four ventral segments of the abdomen, produce wax for comb construction.

Worker activities

Honey sealing 
Mature honey, sufficiently dried, is sealed tightly with wax by workers deputized to do this. Sealing prevents absorption of moisture from the air.

Drone feeding 
Drones do not feed themselves when they are young; they are fed by workers and then when the drone bees get older they feed themselves from the honey supply.

Queen Attendants (days 7-11) 
Queen attendants take care of the queen by feeding and grooming her. Yet, even more important is their incidental role in spreading queen mandibular pheromone (QMP) throughout the hive. This is a pheromone given off by the queen. After coming into contact with the queen, the attendants spread QMP throughout the hive, which is a signal to the rest of the bees that the hive still has a viable queen.

Honeycomb building 
Workers will take wax from wax producing workers and build the comb with it.

Pollen packing 
Pollen brought into the hive for feeding the brood is also stored. It must be packed firmly into comb cells and mixed with a small amount of honey so that it will not spoil. Unlike honey, which does not support bacterial life, stored pollen will become rancid without proper care. It has to be kept in honey cells.

Propolizing 
The walls of the hive are covered with a thin coating of propolis, a resinous substance obtained from plants. When workers add enzymes to the propolis, the combination has antibacterial and antifungal properties. Propolis is placed at the entrance of hives to aid in ventilation.

Some bees add excess mud to the mixture, making it geopropolis, such as in the bee Melipona scutellaris. Geopropolis displays antimicrobial and antiproliferative activity and has been proven to be a source of antibiofilm agents. It also presents selectivity against human cancer cell lines at low concentrations compared to normal cells.

Mortuary bees 
Dead bees and failed larvae must be removed from the hive to prevent disease and allow cells to be reused. They will be carried some distance from the hive by mortuary bees.

Fanning bees 
Worker bees fan the hive, cooling it with evaporated water. They direct airflow into the hive or out of the hive depending on need.

Water carriers 
When the hive is in danger of overheating, these bees will obtain water, usually from within a short distance from the hive and bring it back to spread on the backs of fanning bees.

Guard bees 
Guard bees will stand at the front of the hive entrance, defending it from any invaders such as wasps. The number of guards varies from season to season and from species to species. Entrance size and daily traffic also play an integral role in the number of guard bees present.
Guard bees of the species Tetragonisca angustula  and Schwarziana quadripunctata are examples of eusocial bees that have been observed hovering at their nest entrances, providing more protection against intruders.

Foraging bees (days 22–42) 
The forager and scout bees travel up to 3 kilometres (1.9 mi) to a nectar source, pollen source or to collect propolis.

Genetic characteristics 
In most common bee species, worker bees are infertile due to enforced altruistic kin selection, and thus never reproduce. Workers are nevertheless considered female for anatomical and genetic reasons. Genetically, a worker bee does not differ from a queen bee and can even become a laying worker bee, but in most species will produce only male (drone) offspring. Whether a larva becomes a worker or a queen depends on the kind of food it is given after the first three days of its larval form.

Gut bacteria 
The workers perform different behavioural tasks in the colony that cause them to be exposed to different local environments. The worker gut microbial community composition is found to be associated with the behavioural tasks they perform, therefore also with the local environment they are exposed to and the environmental landscape is shown to affect the gut microbial community (gut microbiota composition) of honey bees.

Stinger 

The worker bee's stinger is a complex organ that allows a bee to defend itself and the hive from most mammals. Attacking bees aim for the face by sensing regions with high levels of carbon dioxide (like mosquitos). Bee stings against mammals and birds typically leave the stinger embedded in the victim due to the structure of flesh and the stinger's barbs. In this case, the venom bulb stays with the stinger and continues to pump.  The bee will die after losing its stinger, as the removal of the stinger and the venom bulb damages or removes other internal organs as well.

The barbs on the stinger will not catch on most animals besides mammals and birds, which means that such animals can be stung many times by the same bee.

Symbolism 

The worker bee is a symbol of Manchester, England. It was adopted as a motif for Manchester during the Industrial Revolution, at a time when Manchester was taking a leading role in new forms of mass production, and symbolises Mancunians' hard work during this era and Manchester being a hive of activity in the 19th century.

Following the Manchester Arena attack on Monday 22 May 2017, the bee emblem gained popularity as a public symbol of unity against terrorism, appearing on protest banners and graffiti.
The song "Worker Bees", by Canadian rock band Billy Talent (from their 2006 album, Billy Talent II), criticizes the actions of the U.S military during their ongoing invasion of middle east; comparing it to the hive mind mentality of worker bees.

Other social bees 
There are many types of eusocial bees, including bumble bees, stingless bees, some orchid bees, and many species of sweat bees, native to all continents except for Antarctica, that have workers. Workers in these other bee lineages do not show significant morphological differences from queens, other than coloration or a smaller average body size, though they are often quite different in their behavior from queens, and may or may not lay eggs. See the respective articles for these lineages for details.

References

External links 

Beekeeping
Bees